The 2002 Tri Nations Series was contested from 13 July to 17 August between the Australia, New Zealand and South Africa national rugby union teams. The All Blacks won the tournament.

South Africa won their first Mandela Challenge Plate in a one-off home test against Australia. Australia made it 5 wins in a row in the Bledisloe Cup, having taken it from New Zealand in 1998. As of 2022, this was the last time that Australia won the Bledisloe Cup.

Table

Results

1 McHugh had to be replaced in the 43rd minute after a drunk South African fan, Pieter van Zyl, ran onto the pitch and tackled him, leaving McHugh with a dislocated shoulder and having to be carried off on a stretcher. He was replaced by Chris White.

External links
Tri Nations at Rugby.com.au

Tri Nations
The Rugby Championship
Tri
Tri
Tri Nations